Charles-François Tarieu de La Naudière (November 4, 1710 – February 1, 1776) was an officer in the colonial regular troops and seigneur in Lower Canada.

He was able to forge a good rapport with the new British and served in the Council for the Affairs of the Province of Quebec after invitation by Governor Guy Carelton in 1775. His political role was short lived as he died in 1776.

He was the father of Charles-Gaspard Tarieu de Lanaudière, who became a political figure in Lower Canada.

External links 
 Biography at the Dictionary of Canadian Biography Online

Charles-Francois Tarieu
People of New France
1710 births
1776 deaths